Sedum dasyphyllum, also named Sedum burnatii and commonly known as Corsican stonecrop or thick-leaved stonecrop, is a low-growing succulent flowering plant of the genus Sedum in the family Crassulaceae.

Description
It is a small perennial plant with green/turquoise or gray/green opposite leaves and a creeping stem forming shrubs. Its flowers are white and small with little black dots on the petals and green ovaries. The Sedum dasyphyllum, typical of the Mediterranean region, usually grows among the rocks, especially among the tuff walls of rural areas.

Gallery

Subspecies and varieties

Sedum dasyphyllum subsp. dasyphyllum
Sedum dasyphyllum subsp. glanduliferum
Sedum dasyphyllum subsp. granatense
Sedum dasyphyllum var. microphyllum

References

External links

Sedum dasyphyllum: infos on backyardgardner.com

dasyphyllum
Garden plants
Plants described in 1753
Taxa named by Carl Linnaeus